Historic Boulder, Inc. is an American 501(c)(3) corporation that works to preserve the historical, architectural, visual and environmental heritage of the Boulder, Colorado area.  The organization was formed in 1972.  Early in its existence, Historic Boulder, Inc. worked to preserve the Boulder Railroad Depot, Boulder Central School and Highland School (Boulder, Colorado).

Boulder, Colorado
Non-profit organizations based in Colorado